Boxing competitions at the 2014 Commonwealth Games in Glasgow, Scotland were held from 25 July to 2 August at the Scottish Exhibition and Conference Centre and were concluded on 2 August at The SSE Hydro. For the first time ever women's boxing was contested.

Medal summary

Medal table

Key

Men's events

Women's events

Participating nations
46 nations competed, leaving 25 that did not

See also
 Boxing at the 2014 Summer Youth Olympics

References

External links
Official results book – Boxing

 
2014 Commonwealth Games events
C
2014
Boxing in Scotland
International boxing competitions hosted by the United Kingdom